Edmund Charles McMillen (born March 2, 1980) is an American video game designer and artist known for his Flash game visual style. His most notable works include 2010's side-scroller Super Meat Boy and 2011's roguelike game The Binding of Isaac and its 2014 remake.

Early life
McMillen was born on March 2, 1980, to a family of "born-again Christians" of Mexican descent. A lifelong resident of Watsonville, in Santa Cruz, California, he attended Soquel High School. He is fond of drawing, his favorite subject being monsters. McMillen spent most of his childhood with his grandmother, whom he considers to be the greatest source of support in his creative endeavors. Later in his life, McMillen received a box from his grandmother that contained all of his drawings as a child. Many of these drawings can be seen by unlocking The Box in one of his games, The Basement Collection. His childhood represents his own game creations, more specifically The Binding of Isaac: Rebirth. In an interview with Indie Game: The Movie he explains that his family was consistently riddled with alcohol and drug addiction. He was confronted by this extreme faith, which caused him religious guilt and mental problems causing him to grow a desire to fight back, resulting in his acting out against them.

Career
McMillen's initial graphic work was in independent comics. While he has largely abandoned this field in favor of video games, he has released a series of comics featuring Meat Boy, the title character in the video game Super Meat Boy, as a promotional tie-in for the game.  His most well-known games are the Flash-based game Meat Boy, and its sequel Super Meat Boy, which has been released for PC, Xbox 360 and PlayStation 4. McMillen is also known for the games Gish, Aether, The Binding of Isaac and Coil. Gish won Game Tunnel's 2004 Adventure Game of the Year, as well as Indie Game of the Year. His game Coil was nominated for the Innovation Award at the 2009 Independent Games Festival.  McMillen was the original character artist and animator on Braid, before those assets were replaced by the work of David Hellman. Braid went on to win the Innovation Award at the 2006 Independent Games Festival prior to its release, and several awards in 2008, including GameSpot's Best Platformer, and Best Original Downloadable Console Game, and the 12th Annual Academy of Interactive Arts & Sciences Awards Casual Game of the Year. His game Aether was a 2009 IndieCade finalist and received an honorable mention.

Super Meat Boy
McMillen and programmer Tommy Refenes established Team Meat, an independent game production company, with the intent that they would never utilize a third-party publisher. Their first game, Super Meat Boy, was released on October 20, 2010, on the Xbox 360 via Xbox Live Arcade, and on Valve's digital distribution system Steam on November 30, 2010. A release was planned for the Nintendo Wii, but was canceled. According to Kotaku, problems arose due to the file size limitations of the Wii's WiiWare Channel. A retail version of the game was released on April 5, 2011. Due to Sony's initial lack of interest in the game, Team Meat entered into contractual obligations that prohibit the game from being released for the Sony PlayStation 3.  McMillen and Refenes responded to the success of Super Meat Boy and the impossibility of a sequel in a brief statement that read, "We feel like we did it...the 1st time." McMillen and Refenes' development of Super Meat Boy was featured in the film Indie Game: The Movie.

In a 2017 interview with Eurogamer, Refenes revealed that McMillen was no longer a part of Team Meat and would not play a role in developing the game's sequel, Super Meat Boy Forever. McMillen later confirmed this in a blog post. Forever was eventually released in late 2020 for various platforms.

The Binding of Isaac 
The Binding of Isaac is an indie roguelike video game designed by Edmund McMillen and Florian Himsl, initially released in 2011 for Microsoft Windows; the game was later ported for OS X, and Linux operating systems. The game's title and plot are inspired by the Biblical story of the Binding of Isaac. In the game, Isaac's mother receives a message from God demanding the life of her son as proof of her faith, and Isaac flees into the monster-filled basement of their home where he must fight to survive. Players control Isaac or one of 33 other unlockable characters through a procedurally generated dungeon in a roguelike manner, fashioned after those of The Legend of Zelda, defeating monsters in real-time combat while collecting items and power-ups to defeat bosses and eventually Isaac's mother.

The game was the result of a week-long game jam between McMillen and Himsl to develop a The Legend of Zelda-inspired roguelike that allowed McMillen to showcase his feelings about both positive and negative aspects of religion that he had come to discover from conflicts between his Catholic and born again Christian family members while growing up. McMillen had considered the title a risk but one he could take after the financial success of Super Meat Boy, and released it without much fanfare to Steam in September 2011, not expecting many sales. The game soon gained popularity partially as a result of various Let's Play videos showcasing the title. McMillen and Himsl released an expansion "Wrath of the Lamb" in May 2012, but were limited from further expansion due to limitations with the Flash platform. They had started working with Nintendo in 2012 to release a 3DS version, but Nintendo later backed out of the deal, citing controversy over the game's religious themes.

Developer Nicalis worked with McMillen in 2014 to complete a remake of the game, The Binding of Isaac: Rebirth, bringing additional features that McMillen had planned that exceeded Flash's limitation, as well as to improve the game's graphics and enable ports for other systems beyond personal computers, including PlayStation 4 and Vita, Xbox One, Wii U, Nintendo 3DS, and the Nintendo Switch. The Binding of Isaac: Rebirth has received three expansions, each one including more bosses, items, and areas. The first expansion, The Binding of Isaac: Afterbirth, released on October 30, 2015, the second expansion, The Binding of Isaac: Afterbirth+, released on January 3, 2017, and the third and final expansion, The Binding of Isaac: Repentance, was released on March 31, 2021.

In 2016, McMillen announced a prequel to The Binding of Isaac titled The Legend of Bum-bo, independently developed by programmer James Interactive and himself. The game was produced over the course of four years, without a working prototype created during the process. The Legend of Bum-bo was digitally released on Steam on November 12, 2019, to mixed reviews. The game was ported to iOS on December 7, 2020, then to Epic Games Store, GOG.com, Nintendo Switch, PlayStation 5 and Xbox Series X & Series S by Nicalis in 2022.

The End is Nigh 
The End Is Nigh is a platform adventure video game developed by Edmund McMillen and Tyler Glaiel. The game was released on July 12, 2017, on Microsoft Windows via Steam. Ports of the game were released on August 15, 2017, on macOS and on December 12, 2017, for Linux and Nintendo Switch, with a port for the PlayStation 4 and PlayStation Vita in development. The game has been described as a spiritual successor to McMillen's Super Meat Boy. The themes within the game were inspired by personal and professional experiences that had happened around the time of the game's development such as threatened lawsuits and his wife's pregnancy. McMillen was contemplating whether he wanted to continue making games, and these thoughts inspired the content of the game.

Works

Upcoming games

Unreleased games

References

External links

 
 Edmund McMillen's old blog
 Edmund McMillen's user page on Newgrounds
 

American atheists
American people of Mexican descent
American video game designers
American video game programmers
People from Santa Cruz, California
1980 births
Living people
Indie video game developers
Board game designers
Browser game developers